India's Next Top Model, season 2 is the second installment of India's Next Top Model. It premiered on MTV India on 10 July 2016 at 7:00 pm IST (UTC+5:30). Eleven finalists were chosen to compete for the show. Lisa Haydon reprised her role as the host/head judge along with judge Dabboo Ratnani, and mentor Neeraj Gaba.

Among with the prizes was a one-year modelling contract with  Bling Talent Management, the opportunity to appear in an editorial spread for Cosmopolitan magazine, a one-year contract with Livon Serum, a campaign for Abof.com website and a jewelry gift from PC Jeweler.

The winner of the competition was 21 year-old Pranati Prakash from Patna.

Cast

Contestants

Judges and mentors 
 Lisa Haydon - presenter / head judge
 Dabboo Ratnani - judge
 Neeraj Gaba - mentor and image consultant

Episodes

Episode 1
Original airdate: 

Summary: This was the casting episode.

Episode 2
Original airdate: 

First call-out: Subhamita Banerjee
Bottom four: Ana Chawdhary, Lekha Prajapati, Pranati Prakash and Raavi Ambiger
Eliminated: Ana Chawdhary, and Raavi Ambiger
Featured photographer: Dabboo Ratnani

Episode 3
Original airdate: 

During this episode, makeovers occurred. Akanksha's long hair was cut as a short pixie cut. She wept after being forced to having the haircut. Also, Pranati's long black hair was cut as a auburn lob with bangs. After makeover, the models have a cover shoot for a Livon Serum product and they also have to decide which one out of three photos should be used for the packaging. And that will be the photo the judges assess at deliberation.

At judging, Lisa Haydon tells them disappointingly that they have chosen photos that accentuate their own strengths, instead of sell the product for the client. But with Neelam, this smart and ambitious girl puts a smile on Lisa’s face by scoring best photo two weeks in a row and even the client calls her picture "fabulous". Priya has once again ended up in bottom two with Minash, whose mature look and average photo only manage to yield a lukewarm response from the judges. Faced with a tough decision, Lisa eventually gives Priya one more chance to translate her passion for modelling into her photoshoots.

Challenge winner/Immune: Pranati Prakash
First call-out: Neelam Virwani
Bottom two: Ashmita Jaggi and Priya Banerjee
Eliminated: Ashmita Jaggi
Guest judge: Manish Malhotra

Episode 4
Original airdate: 

Wildcard Entry: Ritija Malvankar
First call-out: Neelam Virwani
Bottom two: Minash Ravuthar and Priya Banerjee
Eliminated: Minash Ravuthar
Guest judge: Hardee Shah

Episode 5
Original airdate: 

Challenge winner: Rajashree Singha and Poulomi Das
First call-out: Rajashree Singha
Bottom two: Pranati Prakash and Ritija Malvankar
Eliminated: Ritija Malvankar
Special guest: Ricky Singh
Featured photographer: Nuno Oliveira and Ashish Chawla
Guest judge: Upen Patel

Episode 6
Original airdate: 

 	

Challenge winner: Jantee Hazarika and Pranati Prakash
Immune: Jantee Hazarika
First call-out: Pranati Prakash
Bottom two: Poulomi Das and Subhamita Banerjee
Eliminated: None 
Guest judge: Shalmali Kholgade

Episode 7
Original airdate: 

Challenge winner: Jantee Hazarika
First call-out: Pranati Prakash
Bottom three: Neelam Virwani, Poulomi Das, Rajashree Singha	 
Eliminated: Poulomi Das and Rajashree Singha
Guest judge: Milind Soman

Episode 8
Original airdate: 

Challenge winner: Akanksha Sharma
First call-out: Akanksha Sharma
Bottom two: Jantee Hazarika and Neelam Virwani
Eliminated: Neelam Virwani
Featured photographer: Vinit Bhatt
Guest judge: Manish Paul

Episode 9
Original airdate: 

Challenge winner: None
First call-out:  Jantee Hazarika
Bottom three:  Akanksha Sharma, Subhamita Banergee and Priya Banerjee
Eliminated: Akanksha Sharma and Priya Banerjee
Featured photographer: Dabboo Ratnani
Guest judge: Neha Dhupia

Episode 10
Original airdate: 

Final three: Jantee Hazarika, Pranati Prakash and Subhamita Banerjee
Eliminated: Subhamita Banerjee
Final two: Jantee Hazarika and Pranati Prakash
India's Next Top Model: Pranati Prakash

Summaries

Call-out order

 The contestant was eliminated
 The contestant was immune from the elimination
 The contestant was in a non-elimination bottom two
 The contestant won the competition

Photo shoot guide
Episode 1 photo shoot: Harnessed in the sky (casting)
Episode 3 runway show: Manish Malhotra bridal collection
Episode 4 photo shoot: Livon serum campaign
Episode 5 photo shoots: Posing on a horse with a male model; giants wearing Amante lingerie
Episode 6 photo shoots: Acrobats on a trapeze; recyclable materials
Episode 7 runway show: Fire runway
Episode 8 commercial & photo shoot: Livon serum commercial; jewelry beauty shots with a tarantula
Episode 9 photo shoots: Bats hanging upside down; posing with Lisa Haydon
Episode 10 runway show: Lakme Fashion Week 2016

References

External links
Official website

2010s Indian television series
2016 Indian television seasons
Top Model